Roberto Piccoli (born 27 January 2001) is an Italian professional footballer who plays as a forward for  club Empoli, on loan from Atalanta.

Club career

Youth

Piccoli began playing football at the age of 10 for Tritium Calcio, which plays in the fourth division of Italian football. At the age of 13, Piccoli made a move to the Atalanta youth academy after being noticed by Maurizio Costanzi, head of Atalanta youth development. He would remain with Atalanta for the entirety of his youth career.

Piccoli had a successful youth career while playing for Atalanta in the Campionato Primavera 1. In the 2018–19 season, Piccoli scored 14 goals in the league which eventually helped his Atalanta side lift the Campionato Primavera 1 trophy. Piccoli had a similar performance in the 2019–20 season where he scored a total of 7 goals in the league which eventually saw his Atalanta side lift the Campionato Primavera 1 title once again.

Atalanta
He made his professional debut in a 0–0 Serie A tie with Empoli on 15 April 2019.

Loan to Spezia Calcio
On 15 September 2020, he joined Spezia on a season-long loan.

Piccoli scored his first goal for Spezia in a 1–2 loss on 20 December 2020 against Inter Milan.

Return to Atalanta
On 21 August 2021, Piccoli came on as a substitute for Atalanta in an away match against Torino and scored the winning goal in the 93rd minute. This was his first goal for the Bergamo club in the top flight. Piccoli made several more substitute appearances for Atalanta throughout the season, and was named in the starting lineup for the first time against Lazio on 22 January 2022. Piccoli has made a total of 15 appearances for Atalanta in Serie A, while only scoring one goal for the Bergamo club.

Loan to Genoa
Piccoli joined Genoa on loan for the remainder of the 2021–22 season after spending the first half of the season with Atalanta.

Piccoli made his Genoa debut against Roma coming on as a substitute on 5 February 2022 in a 0–0 draw. He made five appearances for Genoa during the remainder of the season, though did not score any goals.

Loan to Hellas Verona
On 30 June 2022, Piccoli joined Hellas Verona on loan for the 2022–23 season.

Loan to Empoli
On 31 January 2023, Piccoli moved on loan to Empoli for 18-months term, with an Empoli option to buy and an Atalanta counter-option to buy back.

International career

Youth

Roberto Piccoli made his first appearance in the Italian national team setup when he came on as a substitute for the Italy U15's in a friendly match against England U15 on 24 April 2016 where the Italians were defeated 2–3.

With the Italy U19 squad he took part in the 2019 UEFA European Under-19 Championship. While qualifying for the 2019 UEFA European Under-19 Championship, Roberto Piccoli scored two goals in a 2–0 victory against the Serbian U19's on 26 March 2019. Piccoli's U-19 side was knocked out in the group stage of the tournament after suffering defeats to both Portugal U19 and Spain U19.

On 3 September 2021 he made his debut with the Italy U21 squad, playing as a starter in the qualifying match won 3–0 against Luxembourg. Roberto Piccoli's last appearance for the Italy U21 squad was on 16 November 2021, playing as a starter in a friendly match won 4–2 against Romania U21.

Senior

Roberto Piccoli has yet to make his senior debut for the Italian national team.

Career statistics

Style of play 
Regarded as a talented young prospect, Piccoli is a player with good technique and a tall stature of 193 centimeters, while mostly being deployed as a center-forward. His height allows him to be dangerous in the air. Gian Piero Gasperini, Atalanta's head coach, describes Roberto Piccoli as great young talent who is a harder worker and a player that brings great value to the team.

Piccoli describes himself as a center-forward who loves to exploit the depth of the defense, while being technically gifted but also explaining he can still improve in that area. Piccoli has said that he is inspired by the likes of Duván Zapata and Mario Mandžukić.

Personal life 
On 22 January 2021, Piccoli met Pope Francis.

Piccoli has a passion for cycling, which he uses to maintain fitness.

Honors 
Atalanta

 2x Italian youth champion (Primavera) 18/19,19/20
 Italian Supercoppa Winner (Primavera) 19/20

Individual

 Italian Golden Boy: 2021
 20 man shortlist for the European Golden Boy award: 2021

References

External links
 
 
 Serie A Profile
 FIGC U18 Profile
 FIGC U19 Profile

2001 births
Living people
Footballers from Bergamo
Association football forwards
Italian footballers
Italy youth international footballers
Italy under-21 international footballers
Atalanta B.C. players
Spezia Calcio players
Serie A players
Genoa C.F.C. players
Hellas Verona F.C. players
Empoli F.C. players